"Substance" is a song by American singer Demi Lovato. She co-wrote the track with Jutes, Laura Veltz, and its producers Alex Nice, Keith Sorrells, and Warren "Oak" Felder. It was released on July 15, 2022, through Island Records. It serves as the second single from Lovato's eighth studio album, Holy Fvck.

Background 
Demi Lovato released the initial teaser for "Substance" on June 29, 2022. The teaser, posted in the form of a video on Instagram, features Lovato singing over the track. The teaser was posted two weeks after the release of her previous song, "Skin of My Teeth", the lead single of Holy Fvck. The song's cover artwork has been described as "abstract". It shows Lovato "sitting at the base of a circular opening, as black sludge spills out".

Composition and lyrics 
"Substance" has been described as a "raucous", "anthemic pop-punk" song. The "rock" genre has also been used as a descriptor for "Substance". It is composed in the key of C-sharp major, and follows a tempo of 85 beats per minute. Lovato sings loudly over guitars and drums inspired by the earlier years of punk music. The lyrics present in the song are a direct criticism of contemporary society, as well as evoking Lovato's previous drug-related problems and mental health problems.

Music video 
In the Cody Critcheloe-directed music video for "Substance", Demi Lovato "wreaks havoc on" different pieces, such as a gold certification award and a wall, which she vandalizes by spray-painting the title of her album, Holy Fvck, on it. There are references to different controversial issues in her life, such as unfair treatment by record labels, attacks on her physical appearance, sexual orientation, gender identity and drug use, which is alluded to in a scene where she stumbles into a "This Is Your Brain on Drugs" PSA. It also contains similarities to the video clip of the song "La La Land", from the album Don't Forget (2008).

At the end of the video, Paris Hilton makes a cameo appearance and sets off a stick of dynamite, as her and Lovato are seated on a motorcycle together. Lovato impersonator Demetria Cherry appears in the video as well.

It was ranked by Paper Magazine as one of the best music videos of 2022.

Live performances 
"Substance" was performed on July 14, 2022, the day prior to the song's release, on Jimmy Kimmel Live.

Credits and personnel 
Obtained from Lovato's official website.
 Demi Lovato – vocals, songwriting
 Warren "Oak" Felder – production, songwriting, recording, programming, keyboards
 Keith "Ten4" Sorrells – songwriting, co-production, programming, guitar, bass, drums
 Alex Niceforo – songwriting, co-production, guitar
 Jutes – songwriting
 Laura Veltz – songwriting
 Oscar Linnander – recording, production assistance, 
 Manny Marroquin – mixing
 Chris Galland – mixing engineering
 Zach Pereyra – mixing engineering
 Anthony Vilchis – mixing engineering
 Chris Gehringer – mastering

Charts

Release history

References 

2022 songs
2022 singles
American pop punk songs
Demi Lovato songs
Island Records singles
Songs written by Demi Lovato
Songs written by Oak Felder
Songs written by Laura Veltz
Songs written by Keith Sorrells